Rich Is the Treasure is a 1952 crime novel by the British writer Maurice Procter. It is the second in a trilogy featuring Scotland Yard Detective Superintendent Philip Hunter, which he wrote alongside the better known series featuring  Chief Inspector Harry Martineau. The plot revolves around a gang creating counterfeit diamonds.

Film adaptation
In 1954 it was adapted into the film  The Diamond directed by Montgomery Tully and starring Dennis O'Keefe, Margaret Sheridan, and Philip Friend. It was distributed by United Artists in both Britain and America where it was released as The Diamond Wizard, a title the book is sometimes also known by.

References

Bibliography
 Goble, Alan. The Complete Index to Literary Sources in Film. Walter de Gruyter, 1999.
 Hubin, Allen J. Crime Fiction, 1749-1980: A Comprehensive Bibliography. Garland Publishing, 1984.
 Reilly, John M. Twentieth Century Crime & Mystery Writers. Springer, 2015.

1952 British novels
British crime novels
British novels adapted into films
Hutchinson (publisher) books
Novels set in London
Novels by Maurice Procter